Walter Forster (12 July 1910 – 25 December 1986) was a German entomologist.

He worked at the Bavarian State Collection of Zoology (Zoologische Staatssammlung München) and led two scientific collecting trips to South America.

Forster is commemorated in the scientific name of a species of South American lizard, Liolaemus forsteri.

References

External links

German entomologists
1910 births
1986 deaths
20th-century German zoologists